Pedro Gil Ferreira (born 18 March 1968) is a Portuguese astrophysicist and author. As of 2016 he is Professor of Astrophysics at the University of Oxford, and a fellow of Wolfson College.

Education and early life
Ferreira was born in Lisbon, Portugal, and attended the Technical University of Lisbon, where he studied engineering from 1986–1991. While there, he taught himself general relativity. He studied for a PhD in theoretical physics at Imperial College London, supervised by Andy Albrecht.

Research and career
He occupied postdoctoral positions at Berkeley and CERN, before returning to the UK to join the faculty in the astrophysics department at the University of Oxford as a research fellow and lecturer. He became Professor of Astrophysics there in 2008. He has been director of the Programme on Computational Cosmology at the Oxford Martin School since 2010, and also runs an astrophysics 'artist in residency' programme. Ferreira regularly lectures at the African Institute for Mathematical Sciences, and has frequently appeared on TV and radio as a science commentator.

Ferreira's main interests are in general relativity and theoretical cosmology. He has authored more than 100 publications in peer-reviewed scientific journals. With Michael Joyce, in 1997 he was one of the first to propose quintessence scalar field models as a possible explanation of dark energy. Ferreira was also a member of the MAXIMA and BOOMERanG balloon-borne CMB experiments, which measured the acoustic peaks of the CMB. He is currently involved in several proposals to test general relativity using the Euclid spacecraft and Square Kilometre Array radio telescope.

Media
Ferreira is a regular contributor to the scientific press, including Nature, Science, and New Scientist, and has authored two popular science books on cosmology and the history of general relativity. One of them, The Perfect Theory, was shortlisted for the 2014 Royal Society Winton Prize for Science Books. He regularly appears on TV and radio to discuss astrophysics and cosmology news stories, and has contributed to several science and mathematics documentaries for the BBC, Discovery Channel, and others.  In 2016 he serves on the editorial board of the  Open Journal of Astrophysics.

Books

TV and video
 Stephen Hawking: Master of the Universe (Channel 4) 2008
 The One Show (BBC) 2009
 Naked Science: Hawking’s Universe (National Geographic) 2009
 Horizon: Is Everything We Know About the Universe Wrong? (BBC) 2010
 Beautiful Equations (BBC) 2010
 The Beauty of Diagrams (BBC) 2010

References

External links
Ferreira's webpage

New Scientist Instant Expert series: General relativity
Lecture on testing gravity at the Perimeter Institute
Scientific publications of Pedro G. Ferreira on INSPIRE-HEP

1968 births
Living people
Scientists from Lisbon
Portuguese astronomers
21st-century British astronomers
Portuguese science writers
English science writers
Portuguese emigrants to England
People associated with CERN
Cosmologists
Fellows of Oriel College, Oxford
Theoretical physicists
English people of Portuguese descent